Pinecrest is a ghost town in Monroe County, Florida, United States, located in the Big Cypress National Preserve, on Loop Road, approximately  west of Fortymile Bend.

History
Due to the geographic disparity between Pinecrest and the county seat in Key West, Pinecrest attracted lawless elements, as well as a population involved in pursuits related to the Everglades, such as alligator hunting, fishing, and frogging.  Al Capone also allegedly owned a mansion and brothel here. The area was largely abandoned as a result of hurricane destruction and the Great Depression, but a saloon, the Gator Hook, sustained until 1977, when the National Park Service began making efforts to remove private facilities in Big Cypress.

Geography

Notable person
Al Capone, Chicago mob boss

References

Former populated places in Monroe County, Florida
Ghost towns in Florida